Seventy-Six Township is a township in Muscatine County, Iowa, in the United States.

History
Seventy-Six Township was organized in 1853. It takes its name from its designation as "township 76 north of range 3 west".

References

Townships in Muscatine County, Iowa
Townships in Iowa
1853 establishments in Iowa